South Lancs/Cheshire 4 was a regional English rugby union league at the ninth tier of national competition for teams from the South Lancashire, Cheshire and Manchester area.  Teams were promoted to South Lancs/Cheshire 3 and generally there was no relegation - although there was up until 2002 when South Lancs/Cheshire 5 was still active. Despite retaining healthy numbers of teams South Lancs/Cheshire 4 was abolished by the end of the 2008-09 season with most teams moving automatically up into South Lancs/Cheshire 3.

Original teams

When this league was introduced in 1996 it contained the following teams:

Halton - relegated from Lancashire South (9th)
Hightown - relegated from Lancashire South (10th)
Holmes Chapel - relegated from Cheshire (9th)
Moore - relegated from Cheshire (8th)
Shell Stanlow - relegated from Cheshire (7th)

South Lancs/Cheshire 4 honours

South Lancs/Cheshire 4 (1996-2000)

The original South Lancs/Cheshire 4 league was ranked at tier 13 of the league system.  Promotion was to South Lancs/Cheshire 3 and, as it was the lowest level in the North-West region, there was no relegation until the creation of South Lancs/Cheshire 5 at the end of the 1999–00 season.

South Lancs/Cheshire 4 (2000-2009)

Northern league restructuring by the RFU at the end of the 1999-2000 season saw the cancellation of North West 1, North West 2 and North West 3 (tiers 7-9).  This meant that South/Lancs Cheshire 4 became a tier 10 league.  The creation of South Lancs/Cheshire 5 meant that there was briefly relegation into that division until it ceased at the end of the 2000–01 season.  South Lancs/Cheshire 4 was itself cancelled at the end of the 2008–09 season with the majority of teams transferred into South Lancs/Cheshire 3.

Number of league titles

Orrell Anvils (2)
Prenton (2)
Eagle (1)
Halton (1)
Manchester Wanderers (1)
Marple (1)
Moore (1)
Mossley Hill (1)
Sale FC (1)
Shell Stanlow (1)
West Park Warriors (1)

Notes

See also
 Cheshire RFU
 Lancashire RFU
 English rugby union system
 Rugby union in England

References

See also
 English Rugby Union Leagues
 English rugby union system
 Rugby union in England

7